Coralliophila bathus is a species of sea snail, a marine gastropod mollusc in the family Muricidae, the murex snails or rock snails.

Description
The length of the shell attains 30.5 mm.

Distribution
This marine sêcies occurs off New Caledonia.

References

 Oliverio, M. (2008). Coralliophilinae (Neogastropoda: Muricidae) from the southwest Pacific. in: Héros, V. et al. (Ed.) Tropical Deep-Sea Benthos 25. Mémoires du Muséum national d'Histoire naturelle (1993). 196: 481-585
 Kilburn R.N., Marais J.P. & Marais A.P. (2010) Coralliophilinae. Pp. 272-292, in: Marais A.P. & Seccombe A.D. (eds), Identification guide to the seashells of South Africa. Volume 1. Groenkloof: Centre for Molluscan Studies. 376 pp.

Gastropods described in 2008
Coralliophila